Reform UK is a right-wing populist political party in the United Kingdom. It was founded with support from Nigel Farage in November 2018 as the Brexit Party, advocating hard Euroscepticism and a no-deal Brexit, and was briefly a significant political force in 2019. After Brexit, it was renamed to Reform UK in January 2021, and became primarily an anti-lockdown party during the COVID-19 pandemic. Subsequently, in December 2022, it began campaigning on broader right-wing populist themes during the British cost-of-living crisis. Its greatest electoral success was as the Brexit Party, which won 29 seats and the largest share of the national vote in the 2019 European Parliament election.

Farage had been leader of UKIP, a right-wing populist and Eurosceptic party, during its zenith in the first half of the 2010s. He returned to frontline politics as leader of a new Brexit Party in the context of the lengthy Brexit process initiated by the result of the 2016 EU referendum, which had been called partly in response to UKIP's influence. The Brexit Party campaigned for a no-deal Brexit, which it described as "a clean-break Brexit". Academic observers described the party as populist. It won high-profile defections from the right-wing Conservative Party, one of the two main parties in the UK, including Ann Widdecombe and Annunziata Rees-Mogg. It also won some endorsements from left-wing supporters of Brexit, including former Respect Party MP George Galloway and former members of the Revolutionary Communist Party. Following the election of leading Brexit campaigner Boris Johnson as leader of the Conservative Party, Farage offered him an electoral pact in the 2019 general election; the offer was rejected, but the Brexit Party unilaterally decided not to stand candidates in constituencies won by the Conservatives in the previous election.

On 31 January 2020, the United Kingdom withdrew from the European Union. The Brexit Party had styled itself as being focused on reform of democracy in Britain, and by May 2020, there were proposals to re-brand it as the Reform Party. The COVID-19 pandemic hit the UK in 2020 and the government imposed a national lockdown to slow the spread of the disease. Farage re-branded the party as Reform UK around the end of the year to focus on anti-lockdown campaigning. He stepped down as leader in March 2021 and was replaced by Richard Tice.

History

Brexit Party

 
A company called The Brexit Party Limited was incorporated with Companies House on 23 November 2018. It was formally announced on 20 January 2019 by former UKIP economics spokesperson Catherine Blaiklock, who served as the party's initial leader. On 5 February 2019, it was registered with the United Kingdom Electoral Commission to run candidates in any English, Scottish, Welsh and European Union elections.

On the day of the announcement, Nigel Farage, who had been an independent MEP since his departure from UKIP in early December 2018, said that the party was Blaiklock's idea, but that she had acted with his full support. In a 24 January 2019 interview, Blaiklock said: "I won't run it without Nigel [Farage], I'm a nobody and I haven't got any ego to say that I am an anybody", and that: "I'm happy to facilitate Nigel and do the donkey work and work for him, but I don't have any illusions as to myself". On 8 February 2019, Farage stated he would stand as a candidate for the party in any potential future European Parliament elections contested in the United Kingdom. MEPs Steven Woolfe and Nathan Gill, also formerly of UKIP, stated that they would also stand for the party.

On 1 February 2019, Blaiklock told The Daily Telegraph the party had raised £1 million in donations, and that over 200 people had come forward offering to stand for the Brexit Party at the May 2019 European Parliament election, if the United Kingdom had not left the European Union by then.

After announcing the party's formation, Blaiklock attracted criticism for Islamophobic comments on social media, made between 2017 and 2019. She resigned as party leader on 20 March 2019 over since-deleted anti-Islam messages on Twitter, including re-tweeting messages by far-right figures including Mark Collett, Tommy Robinson and Joe Walsh. Farage said that he would take over as leader, that Blaiklock was "never intended to be the long-term leader" and that the party "is at the moment a virtual party – it's a website". On the party's launch on 12 April, asked about issues with Blaiklock, Farage said: "I set the party up, she was the administrator that got it set up. We had a couple of teething problems, yes, but are we going to be deeply intolerant of all forms of intolerance? Yes."

In April 2019, the party's treasurer Michael McGough was removed from his position after The Guardian uncovered antisemitic and homophobic social media comments he had posted in 2017.

On 22 November 2019, the Brexit Party set out its proposals for the 2019 UK general election. They included a wide range of policy areas including taxation, reforming politics, immigration and the environment. The party received two percent of the vote in the election, with none of its 273 candidates winning a seat.

Transition into Reform UK 
Before the general election on 8 December 2019, the party's leader Nigel Farage announced that, following Brexit, the party would change its name to the "Reform Party", and campaign for changes in the electoral system and structure of the House of Commons.

In July 2020 Italexit, a Eurosceptic party inspired by the Brexit Party, was founded in Italy.

In November 2020, Farage and Tice announced that they had applied to the Electoral Commission to re-name the Brexit Party to 'Reform UK', and stated that the party would campaign on a platform that was opposed to further COVID-19 pandemic lockdowns (due to the ongoing COVID-19 pandemic) and that it would seek to reform aspects of UK Governance, including the BBC and House of Lords. The group supports the Great Barrington Declaration.

An analysis by the pollster YouGov cast doubt on the prospective appeal of the rebranded party, stating that the overlap of voters with a positive opinion of Nigel Farage and those with a negative opinion of COVID-19 lockdowns was small, at an estimated 7% of the electorate. The charity Reform, which holds the domain name reform.uk, had complained to the Electoral Commission regarding the name change, claiming that it risks damaging its goodwill through name confusion. The Renew Party also logged a complaint with the Electoral Commission on the grounds that the rebrand would mislead voters on the grounds that it was easy to confuse 'Reform' and 'Renew'.

On 4 January 2021, the party's name change to Reform UK was approved by the Electoral Commission.

In 2021, Reform UK gained representation in the Scottish Parliament when former Conservative and then independent MSP Michelle Ballantyne joined the party and was named Reform UK's leader in Holyrood by Nigel Farage. She lost her and the party's only seat in Scotland in the 2021 Scottish Parliament election. She quit as the party's leader in Scotland in February 2022. Farage stepped down as leader in March 2021, being replaced by party chairman Richard Tice. Former North West England MEP David Bull was appointed as deputy leader of the party on 11 March 2021.

On 26 March 2021, it was announced that former Brexit Party MEP Nathan Gill had become the Leader of Reform UK Wales.

In 2021, Reform UK announced its intention to field a full slate of candidates in the Senedd, Scottish Parliament and London Assembly elections with leader Richard Tice standing for election in the latter. However, the party did not nominate a candidate for London Mayor after making a pact with Reclaim Party leader and actor Laurence Fox. Fox finished sixth in the mayoral election with less than 2% of the votes. The party failed to win any seats above local level in the 2021 elections in May, as well as losing their deposit in the Hartlepool by-election. In the Senedd election, the party fielded a full slate of candidates in every constituency and on the regional lists, but picked up just 1.6% of the constituency vote (7th place) and 1.1% of the regional list votes (8th place). In the Scottish Parliament election, no constituency candidates were fielded and the party received just 5,793 list votes across the whole country despite standing in every region in Scotland. In the London Assembly election, none of their constituency candidates were elected and the party finished tenth on the London-wide list with 25,009 votes.

In October 2022, Reform UK and the Social Democratic Party (SDP) announced an electoral pact. In December 2022, David White, a Conservative member of Barnsley Metropolitan Borough Council, and Richard Langridge, a Conservative member of West Oxfordshire District Council, both defected to Reform UK in order to stand as prospective parliamentary candidates for the party.
The press gave renewed attention to Reform UK in December 2022—during the cost-of-living crisis—after Farage announced it would stand a full slate of candidates at the next general election. Tice remains leader of the party. After some opinion polls indicated a modest increase in support for Reform UK, The Telegraph described the party as a "threat on the Right" to the Conservative government of Prime Minister Rishi Sunak.

Representation

European Parliament
In February 2019, nine MEPs who had left UKIP joined the party: Tim Aker, Jonathan Bullock, David Coburn, Bill Etheridge, Nigel Farage, Nathan Gill, Diane James, Paul Nuttall and Julia Reid. All were originally elected as UKIP candidates, but all had previously left the party in opposition to Gerard Batten's leadership, mostly in December 2018. MEP and former UKIP member Steven Woolfe also indicated his support for the party in February.

In mid-April 2019, Jane Collins, Ray Finch, Jill Seymour, and Margot Parker left UKIP to join the Brexit Party. Jonathan Arnott, who had resigned from UKIP three months earlier, also joined the party then, thus bringing the total number of Brexit Party MEPs to 14. Thus, 14 of the 24 UKIP MEPs who had been elected in 2014 were now in the party. They all were members of the Europe of Freedom and Direct Democracy (EFDD) group.

Only three of the incumbent MEPs − Farage, Gill and Bullock − were selected to stand for the Brexit Party in the 2019 election.

On 23 May 2019, 29 Brexit Party MEPs were newly elected to the European Parliament, including Richard Tice and former Conservative MP Ann Widdecombe, while Jonathan Bullock, Nigel Farage and Nathan Gill kept their seats. The Brexit Party MEPs were Non-Inscrits, not members of a group in the Parliament.

MEP Andrew England Kerr was expelled from the party on 29 September 2019 over a potential conflict of interest. Farage explained that England Kerr made "comments about a business and a product that he has a direct financial investment in and we think that is unacceptable." MEP Louis Stedman-Bryce resigned on 19 November 2019 in response to "The Brexit Party’s recent decision to select a Scottish candidate who has openly posted homophobic views".

With Brexit on 31 January 2020, all UK MEP positions ceased to exist.

Senedd
On 15 May 2019, four Members originally elected or co-opted for UKIP (Caroline Jones, Mandy Jones, Mark Reckless and David Rowlands) joined the Brexit Party. Reckless was appointed as Leader of their group. One Member, elected as UKIP but by this time sitting as an independent, Michelle Brown, was told she would not be welcome in the party. The Brexit Party Wales was to campaign in 2021 Senedd election to scrap the current system of devolution, and replace it with a directly-elected first minister accountable to Welsh MPs. The leader of the party in Wales, Mark Reckless, said in the interview on 15 May 2020 that Nigel Farage is "consulted over key decisions... but he doesn't micro-manage us here". On 18 August 2020, Caroline Jones released a statement stating that she had quit the Brexit Party Welsh Parliament Group to sit as an Independent member due to the newly-adopted anti-devolution stance the Brexit Party had adopted.

On 16 October 2020, Mandy Jones and David Rowlands left the party's group in the Senedd to form a new Independent members group jointly with Caroline Jones. The group, The Independent Alliance for Reform, sought to reform the Senedd rather than abolish. Mandy Jones and Rowlands remained members of the Brexit Party, and are still members of Reform UK.

On 19 October 2020, the final remaining Brexit Party Senedd group member, Mark Reckless left the party to join the Abolish the Welsh Assembly Party.
The party did not hold any MS seats after the 2021 Senedd election

Scottish Parliament
On 11 January 2021, independent MSP Michelle Ballantyne joined Reform UK. Ballantyne became an MSP for the 16-member district of South Scotland in 2017 when incumbent Rachael Hamilton resigned to stand in a by-election for a single-member seat. Ballantyne first sat as a Conservative but left the party in 2020 over opposition to COVID-19 lockdown restrictions. Ballantyne continued to sit as an independent until January 2021 when she joined Reform UK and was appointed leader of the Scottish party. She continued to sit with the party until the 2021 Scottish Parliament election, where she lost her regional seat to a candidate from the Scottish Conservatives. She quit as the party's leader in Scotland in February 2022.

Ideology and platform
The party's lead aim was for the United Kingdom to leave the European Union, now achieved, and then trade with countries on World Trade Organization terms. On 12 April 2019, Farage said that there was "no difference between the Brexit party and UKIP in terms of policy, [but] in terms of personnel, there's a vast difference", criticising UKIP's connections to the far right. He also said that the party aimed to attract support "across the board", including from former UKIP voters and from Conservative and Labour voters who supported Brexit. Later in April, Farage said that the party would not publish a manifesto until after the European elections had taken place. Farage said the party would have a policy platform instead of a manifesto. Farage has described his admiration for how fellow Europe of Freedom and Direct Democracy members, Italy's Five Star Movement, have managed to grow from a protest group into the country's largest political party in both houses of the Italian Parliament. He has described the Brexit Party as doing the same kind of thing and "running a company, not a political party, hence our model of registered supporters" and building a base using an online platform. 
The British politics professor Matthew Goodwin describes the party as national populists, while Goodwin and others have also described the Brexit Party as populist, right-wing populist, right-wing nationalist, and neoliberal.

The party's constitution was published by the Electoral Commission as a result of a freedom of information request in May 2019. It describes the party as seeking to "promote and encourage those who aspire to improve their personal situation and those who seek to be self-reliant, whilst providing protection for those genuinely in need; favour the ability of individuals to make decisions in respect of themselves; seek to diminish the role of the State; lower the burden of taxation on individuals and businesses." SDP politician Patrick O'Flynn, who was elected as a UKIP MEP under Farage's leadership and supported the Brexit Party in the 2019 European elections, commented on the constitution's description of the party as following classical liberalism and described them as having a Thatcherite ideological core. James Glancy, one of the party's MEPs, has compared the party to the Referendum Party, being a "united and diverse group of people from different political backgrounds".

The party's first non-Brexit-related policy was announced on 4 June 2019: a proposition to transform British Steel into a partly worker-owned company, in what has been described as "a hybrid of Conservative and Labour policy". The party also supports cutting Britain's foreign aid budget, scrapping the proposed HS2 project and introducing free WiFi on all British public transport. Furthermore, the party has said it will scrap all interest paid on student tuition fees, has suggested reimbursing graduates for historic interest payments made on their loans, and has pledged to abolish inheritance tax.

The party has signed a cross-party declaration alongside the Liberal Democrats, Green Party of England and Wales, and the Scottish National Party, calling for first-past-the-post voting to be replaced by a proportional system for Westminster elections.

2019 UK general election platform as the Brexit Party

On 22 November 2019, the Brexit Party set out its policy proposals for the 2019 UK general election. Its key policies for the election included:

No extension to the Brexit transition period
No privatisation of the NHS
Reducing immigration
Cutting VAT on domestic fuel
Banning the UK exporting its waste
Providing free broadband in deprived regions
Scrapping the television licence fee
Abolishing inheritance tax
Scrapping High Speed 2 (HS2)
Abolishing interest on student loans
Changing planning to help house building
Reforming the Supreme Court
Reform the voting system to make it more representative
Abolish the House of Lords
Making MPs who switch parties subject to recall petitions
Reform the postal voting system to combat fraud
Introduce Citizens’ Initiatives to allow people to call referendums, subject to a 5 million threshold of registered voter signatures and time limitations on repeat votes

2020–present

Following the UK's departure from the European Union on 31 January 2020, that is "Brexit", Farage has sought a new right-wing populist project for the party under its new name of Reform UK by opposing COVID-19 restrictions, paralleling right-wing populist anti-lockdown sentiments in other countries.

On 3 October 2021, the party's leader, Richard Tice, criticised the Conservative Party as a party of "high tax" at Reform UK's party conference in Manchester. He pledged to offer a lower-tax vision at the next election, saying his party would stand on a low-tax and low-regulation platform. The party supports raising the threshold at which people start paying income tax from £12,500 to £20,000, and exempt the smallest businesses from corporation tax. He also criticised the Conservative Party's plans to decarbonise the economy, saying that the UK should instead focus on exploiting reserves of shale gas. He also said that energy companies should be owned by the government or British pension funds to stop profits going abroad.

Energy
Reform UK wants to resume fracking and re-establish coal mining in the United Kingdom. It also wants to expand the production of oil and gas from the North Sea.

Healthcare
The party has stated that it would cut NHS waiting times within two years by increasing the use of private healthcare operations, at a cost of £30 billion.

Funding and structure
The Brexit Party officially has three members, as the Electoral Commission requires at least two named members to be registered as a political party. The three members are currently Richard Tice, Nominating Officer Tracy Knowles and Treasurer Mehrtash A’Zami. The party structure has been criticised for not providing the party's over 115,000 paying registered supporters with any voting power to influence party policy; Farage retains a high level of control over decision-making, including hand-picking candidates himself.

Farage has said the party would largely be funded by small donations and that they raised "£750,000 in donations online, all in small sums of less than £500" in their first ten days. The party also accepts large donations, such as £200,000 donated by Jeremy Hosking, a former donor to the Conservative Party. He further said that the party would not be taking money from the key former UKIP funder Arron Banks. Farage personally faced questions during the 2019 electoral campaign after Channel 4 News revealed undeclared travel and accommodation benefits provided by Banks before Farage joined the Brexit Party, and on 21 May 2019 the European Parliament formally opened an investigation. In response to the reporting, the Brexit Party banned Channel 4 News from its events.

Later in 2019, £6.4m was donated to the party by Christopher Harborne.

Two days before the 2019 European election, Farage accused the Electoral Commission of "interfering in the electoral process" after the independent watchdog visited the Brexit Party headquarters for "active oversight and regulation" of party funding. Official donations of £500 or more must be given by a "permissible donor", who should either be somebody listed on the British electoral roll or a business registered at Companies House and operating in Britain. When asked if the party took donations in foreign currency, Farage replied: "Absolutely not, we only take sterling – end of conversation." Shadow Chancellor John McDonnell called for "a full and open and transparent, independent inquiry into the funding of Mr Farage". On Sky News in May 2019, a Scottish National Party MEP, Alyn Smith, claimed that the Brexit Party is "a shell company that's a money laundering front". The Brexit Party threatened legal action unless Smith retracted the claim. Smith apologised unreservedly and admitted that he had no evidence for his allegation, and made a donation to the party's legal costs as well as to the charity Help for Heroes.

As of February 2020, and probably since May 2020, Farage holds 8 of the 15 shares in The Brexit Party Ltd.

As well as the leader and chairman, other leadership roles were assigned to Brian Monteith as Chief Whip in the European Parliament (before Brexit) and David Bull as health spokesperson during the 2019 election.

In January 2021, former Conservative and then independent MSP Michelle Ballantyne joined the party and assumed the role of Leader of Reform UK Scotland.

Leaders 
Reform UK has had three leaders. Catherine Blaiklock was its first leader and served from 20 January 2019 to 20 March 2019, before resigning as party leader due to anti-Islam messages she posted on her Twitter account before she took on the role. Richard Tice, the party's current leader, took on the role following the resignation of Nigel Farage.

Elections

2019 European Parliament elections 
The party stood candidates in Great Britain at the 2019 European elections, including the former Conservative Minister of State Ann Widdecombe, the journalist Annunziata Rees-Mogg (a former Conservative general election candidate and the sister of the Conservative MP and Brexit advocate Jacob Rees-Mogg), the Leave Means Leave co-founder Richard Tice, the writers Claire Fox and James Heartfield (both once part of the Revolutionary Communist Party and later writers for Spiked), Stuart Waiton (a fellow Spiked contributor) James Glancy, a former member of the Royal Marines and the Special Boat Service who was awarded the Conspicuous Gallantry Cross, Martin Daubney, a journalist and commentator, David Bull, author and television presenter, Brian Monteith, a former Conservative Party MSP, Rupert Lowe, a businessman and retired Rear Admiral Roger Lane-Nott. John Longworth, the former director-general of the British Chambers of Commerce, announced he would be standing as a candidate for the party on 15 April 2019. The party was not registered in Northern Ireland and did not field candidates there.

A survey of 781 Conservative Party councillors found that 40% planned to vote for the Brexit Party. On 17 April 2019, the former Labour and Respect Party MP George Galloway announced his support for the Brexit Party "for one-time only" in the 2019 European Parliament election. On 24 April, the political columnist Tim Montgomerie announced that he would vote for the party and endorsed Widdecombe's candidature, and the Conservative MP Lucy Allan described the candidates of the party as "fantastic".

On 2 May, one of the party's candidates for the North West constituency, Sally Bate, resigned from the party in response to previous comments made by Claire Fox, the lead candidate in the constituency, on the Warrington bomb attacks.

In May 2019, several polls forecast the party polling first for the European elections, though earlier polls had suggested it would come third to Labour and the Conservatives.

The party held 14 seats (acquired through defections) going into the elections, and saw an increase of 15. It won five more seats than UKIP, at the time under Farage's leadership, had at the previous election.

The party won 29 seats in the election, becoming the biggest single party in the 9th European Parliament. The CDU/CSU Union also won 29 seats in Germany, but it was an alliance and not a party.

Three of the MEPs resigned the whip in December 2019 in order to support the Conservative Party at the 2019 general election, A fourth, John Longworth, was also expelled for "repeatedly undermining" the party's election strategy.

The 29 MEPs originally elected were as follows:

House of Commons 

Farage said the party intended to stand candidates at the 2019 general election. In April 2019 he promised not to stand candidates against the 28 Eurosceptic Conservative MPs who opposed the Brexit withdrawal agreement. In the Peterborough by-election in June, the Brexit Party came second with 28% of the vote, 7% ahead of the Conservatives and 2% behind Labour.

Following Boris Johnson's election as Prime Minister, Farage unveiled the names of 635 general election candidates for the Brexit Party, including himself. On 8 September 2019, Farage wrote an article in the Sunday Telegraph and the Brexit Party took out advertisements in Sunday newspapers offering an electoral pact with the Conservative Party in the forthcoming general election, in which the Brexit Party would not be opposed by the Conservatives in traditional Labour Party seats in the north of England, the Midlands and Wales, and the Brexit Party would not contest seats in which they could split the Leave vote. Farage wrote that Boris Johnson should ask himself "does he want to sign a non-aggression pact with me and return to Downing Street?"

Farage had suggested that the Brexit and Conservative parties could form an electoral pact to maximise the seats taken by Brexit-supporting MPs, but this was rejected by Johnson. On 11 November, Farage then said his party would not stand in any of the 317 seats won by the Conservatives at the last election. Conservative Party chairman James Cleverly welcomed this, although he stated that the parties had not been in contact. Newsnight reported that conversations between members of the Brexit Party and the pro-Brexit Conservative group, the European Research Group (ERG) had led to this decision. The Brexit Party is reported to have requested that Boris Johnson publicly state he would not extend the Brexit transition period beyond the planned date of 31 December 2020 and that he wished for a Canada-style free-trade agreement with the EU. Johnson did make a statement covering these two issues, something which Farage referenced as key when announcing he was standing down some candidates. Both the Brexit Party and the Conservatives denied any deal was done between the two. The decision to not run in those seats met with criticism by some Brexit Party supporters and candidates; some candidates who had been selected to vie for Conservative seats opted to run as independent candidates on a Pro-Brexit platform.

The Brexit Party failed to win any seats in the general election. Its best second places were in Barnsley Central, where Victoria Felton won 30.4% of the vote, and Barnsley East, where Jim Ferguson won 29.2%. High third places were in Hartlepool, where Richard Tice won 25.8% of the vote, and Hull West and Hessle, where Michelle Dewberry won 18%.

Local government
The party first stood at local government level in two by-elections in Gloucester on 25 July 2019. They did not win either.

A councillor elected to Rochdale defected to the party in July 2019 from Labour, making for the first councillor; shortly after a Liberal Democrat councillor there also defected. All 12 of Rotherham's then UKIP councillors defected to the Brexit Party in July 2019, as did all 5 of Derby's UKIP councillors. On 13 September 2019, ten independent councillors on Hartlepool Borough Council defected to the Brexit Party. They then formed a pact with the three Conservatives to hold 13 of the 33 seats. In September 2019, a Conservative councillor for Surrey (county) and Elmbridge (borough) defected to the party, after his party decided he would not be reselected.

The 13 councillors of the Hartlepool council group left the party in 2020. The Rotherham group left to form the Rotherham Democratic Party. The party won two seats in the 2021 United Kingdom local elections, both in Derby, one a hold from a previous defection and the other a gain. These were the first council seats won at election by the party, as all their previous ones had been via defections. This left them with eight councillors in total; six in Derby and two more from defections, one in Redbridge from the Conservatives, and one in Swale from UKIP, both in April 2021.

In December 2021, days before the North Shropshire by-election, local councillor and Deputy Mayor of Market Drayton Town Council, Mark Whittle, defected to the party from the Conservatives.

It was reported that all of Reform UK's candidates in the 2022 United Kingdom local elections "will campaign on the benefits of fracking and restarting exploration in the North Sea". Three of the eight council seats held by the party were up for re-election in 2022, all of which had arisen from defections. Both Derby seats were held, but a seat in Redbridge was lost. No new seats were gained.

In December 2022, two former Conservative councillors - one in Barnsley and the other in West Oxfordshire - defected to the party. Another Conservative councillor, Barry Gwilt, of the Fazeley on Lichfield District Council, defected to Reform UK in January 2023.

Electoral performance

Senedd elections

Scottish Parliament elections

London Assembly elections

See also
Euroscepticism in the United Kingdom
Brexit Party election results
Opinion polling for 2019 European Parliament election in the UK
Opinion polling for the 2019 United Kingdom general election

References

Further reading
 James Dennison. 2020. "How Niche Parties React to Losing Their Niche: The Cases of the Brexit Party, the Green Party and Change UK." Parliamentary Affairs, Volume 73, Pages 125–141

External links

 
2018 establishments in the United Kingdom
Eurosceptic parties in the United Kingdom
Nigel Farage
Political parties established in 2018
Right-wing parties in the United Kingdom
Right-wing populist parties
UK Independence Party breakaway groups
Brexit
Impact of the COVID-19 pandemic in the United Kingdom on politics